Warwick Parkway is a railway station with Park and Ride facilities on the western outskirts of Warwick in Warwickshire, England.  It also serves the village of Budbrooke. The station is owned by Network Rail and Warwickshire County Council.

Warwick is also served by the older Warwick railway station in the town centre.

History
Warwick Parkway was opened on 25 October 2000. It was opened with Park and Ride facilities alongside the A46 and A4177 roads in order to encourage commuters to use the train, and to compensate for the lack of parking spaces at the nearby  and  stations. It was financially supported by Warwickshire County Council. Planning permission was given for the station in March 1999, following a public inquiry in October 1998.

Facilities

Each platform at the station has a real-time electronic information departure screen.

The station is staffed for much of the day and there are self-service ticket machines as well as a permit to travel machine just inside the entrance to the station. A subway links northbound and southbound platforms. Also there is a small cafe selling drinks and snacks.

Local Stagecoach in Warwickshire bus services 68 and X17 also link the station with Warwick, Leamington Spa, Kenilworth and Coventry. There is also a National Express coach stop outside the station with regular links to Heathrow and Gatwick airports.

The station originally had 737 car parking spaces. Another 222 places were added in 2012 at a cost of £2.5 million. Work on the project started on 25 June 2012. Additional spaces were made available in phases from 29 October 2012 with an official opening in late November 2012.

Services
The station is served by Chiltern on its London Marylebone to Birmingham (Moor Street or Snow Hill) service, which usually calls at half hourly intervals, this is augmented by a few West Midlands Trains services between Birmingham and Leamington at peak periods.

References

External links

 Photos of Warwick Parkway Station
Rail Around Birmingham and the West Midlands: Warwick Parkway station

Railway stations in Warwickshire
DfT Category D stations
Railway stations opened by Railtrack
Railway stations in Great Britain opened in 2000
Railway stations served by Chiltern Railways
Railway stations served by West Midlands Trains
Warwick